Trent University is a public liberal arts university in Peterborough, Ontario, with a satellite campus in Oshawa, which serves the Regional Municipality of Durham. Trent is known for its Oxbridge college system and small class sizes.

As a collegiate university, Trent is made up of six colleges. Each college has its own residence halls, dining room, and student government. The student government (Cabinet) and its committees cooperate with the College Office and dons in planning and delivering a variety of events for both its non-resident and resident members: visiting scholars, artists, musicians, scientists; College dinners and dances; Fall and Winter College Weekend; and intramural co-educational competitions in a number of sports. Although Trent University is predominantly undergraduate, graduate programs are offered at the master's and doctoral levels.

Trent was founded through the efforts of a citizens' committee interested in creating a university to serve the City of Peterborough and the surrounding counties, and was created by the Trent University Act, 1962–63. The committee recruited Dean Thomas H. B. Symons of the University of Toronto to serve as chair of the academic planning committee and Symons became the university's first president.

The Symons campus of Trent, named after founding president Thomas Symons, is located on the banks of the Otonabee River at the northeast corner of the City of Peterborough. The Symons campus plan and its original college buildings, including Champlain College, Lady Eaton College, Bata Library, Chemistry Building, and the Faryon bridge which spans the Otonabee, were designed by Canadian architect Ron Thom.

Over 9 000 undergraduate students and over 800 graduate students are enrolled at the Peterborough campus while Trent University Durham GTA serves over 1 900 full- and part-time students at the campus on Thornton Road in Oshawa. The university is represented in Canadian Interuniversity Sport by the Trent Excalibur.

History 

Trent University resulted from a community discussion in 1957 about opening a post-secondary institution in the Trent Valley. The campaign for a post-secondary institution in Peterborough coincided with the Ontario government's policy of creating new universities and expanding existing institutions to respond to population pressure and the belief that higher education was a key to social justice and economic productivity for individuals and for society.

In 1963 Trent University was founded as a non-denominational, public institution in downtown Peterborough, Ontario. It was established as a provincial university under the Trent University Act, 1962–63. In fall 1964, the university welcomed its first students, its campus consisting of three refurbished older buildings in central Peterborough: Rubidge Hall, Catherine Parr Traill College for women, and Peter Robinson College for men. The governor general, Georges Vanier, officially opened Trent University in 1964. That year there were about 100 students attending the university.

Modelled on the provincial University of Toronto Act of 1906, Trent established a bicameral system consisting of a senate (faculty), responsible for academic policy, and a board of governors (citizens), exercising exclusive control over financial policy and having formal authority in all other matters. The president, appointed by the board, was to provide a link between the two bodies and to perform institutional leadership.

Canadian General Electric, a major industrial employer in Peterborough, donated a 100-acre parcel of land along the Otonabee River; other lands were subsequently acquired on both sides of the river to serve as the site of the university's permanent campus. The CGE donation included a functioning hydroelectric power plant dating from the 1890s, which still generates a substantial portion of the university's electricity and produces income for the university. The power plant underwent a $22.8-million upgrade in 2013; Trent University owns 50% of the power plant with Peterborough Utilities Group owning the remaining 50%.

The university's Geography Department was set up in 1968, and in 1969 the university offered Canada's first Native Studies program.

In 2017 Trent announced the Trent University Research & Innovation Park (since renamed to Cleantech Commons). That year the university enrolled about 3,500 new students.

Current Colleges

Catharine Parr Traill College 
This college was named after pioneer writer and biologist Catharine Parr Traill. It is the only Trent college situated in downtown Peterborough and is the oldest remaining college. It serves as the base for the undergraduate departments of English, Cultural Studies, Media Studies, Canadian Studies and the Trent-Swansea Dual Degree in Law program. Four graduate programs have offices in the college including Public Texts (English); Cultural Studies; History; as well as the Frost Centre for Canadian Studies and Indigenous Studies. Traill College is also the home of Trent University's Continuing Education program.

Traill College consists of Wallis Hall which offers a mix of academic, residential, and recreational spaces, including The Trend restaurant established in 1967. Scott House — the original location of Catharine Parr Traill College — is home to the College Office, College Library, Junior and Senior common rooms, lecture spaces and the Department of Cultural Studies. Other buildings include the Crawford House residence, Stewart House, Kerr House, and Fry Lodge (formerly the Principal's Lodge), which is named after the college's first principal, Marion Fry.

The university previously owned Bradburn and Langton Houses on the adjacent London Street, but both properties were sold to the Peterborough Housing Corporation in 2009. The Langton House property was sold to Hospice Peterborough in 2012, demolished and converted into a residential hospice. In fall 1999, a university task force recommended closing the college as a cost-saving measure, which led to a flurry of protest and a successful campaign to save Traill. In 2008, it was converted to a centre of graduate studies. In 2016, an external presidential review of the college was ordered. It recommended that Traill return to its roots as a more "traditional" college, welcome back undergraduate members, and expand its services and reach into the local community.

Champlain College 
Located on Symons Campus along the Otonabee River, this college was opened in 1966. It is named after the early 17th century explorer Samuel de Champlain, who visited the Otonabee area in 1615. A noted cartographer, diplomat and soldier he also founded Quebec City in 1608 and his sword is featured in the Trent crest. Champlain College originally served as an all-male residence, along with Peter Robinson College. The college is home to the Political Studies department, Trent International, the university bookstore and the Trent University Alumni Association.

Lady Eaton College 
Established in 1968 as an all-women's college, it is named in honour of local resident Flora McCrea Eaton, Lady Eaton. The college contains the offices for the departments of History, Philosophy, Classics, Women's Studies, and French and Francophone Studies.

Otonabee College 

Otonabee College was founded in 1972. The buildings of Otonabee range along a cedar ridge overlooking the river from which the college derives its name ("fast water" in Nishnaabee). Eight "houses" connected by an interior walkway called "the Link", make up Otonabee's residence. The residence is co-educational, although there are single-sex areas within the houses. Past "the Link" (a path leading to the instructional area of the college which bisects the residences), are a set of faculty offices, the mailboxes, and the main dining hall looking to the north and east of the grounds. The academic wing is directly connected with the Science Buildings and houses the School of Education, the departments of Psychology, Anthropology, Sociology, and Computing & Information Systems. Teaching facilities include a 125-seat lecture theatre, various seminar rooms, laboratories for Anthropology and Psychology and Computer Science, and a Sociology resource room, offices for faculty in many of the disciplines in arts and sciences, and the Wenjack Theatre, which provides a venue for multimedia lecture presentations as well as theatrical productions by amateur and professional companies.

Peter Gzowski College 
Founded in 2003, it is the newest of the Trent University colleges, named for CBC broadcaster Peter Gzowski, who was Trent's 8th chancellor. At one point the college had two campuses: on Peterborough's Argyle Street in buildings leased from the Eastern Pentecostal Bible College, now Master's College and Seminary, which housed the Teacher Education and Nursing programs; and the Enwayaang building on the main Symons campus. ("Enwayaang" means "the way we speak together" in the Anishinaabe language.) Enwayaang housed the Indigenous Studies, Economics, Mathematics and Business Administration programs. Programs at the Argyle location were moved to Enwayaang prior to the 2006–2007 academic year.

Former Colleges

Peter Robinson College 
The first college to open at the university, it was dedicated to Peter Robinson, the member of the Legislative Assembly of Upper Canada who oversaw migration of Irish settlers to the area in the 1820s. The college used to have a residence (apartment style) until its sale to a private landlord in 2004. The college was shut down by the university administration, against the protests of many Peter Robinson students and faculty. By referendum in March 2003, Trent students voted to create and operate a non-profit educational and cultural student facility, to be shared with the community as a whole. Chosen to house this new facility was Sadleir House: one of the original university buildings at the PR site, it holds special historical significance for both the Trent and Peterborough communities. Funded by a new student levy and organized as the P.R. Community and Student Association (PRCSA), the students' offer to purchase the property was accepted by the current non-university owners. The Trust secured a mortgage for the property and the students took possession of Sadleir House on 27 February 2004. Currently, each student pays a levy fee each year to support the operations of the house. Among other things, Sadleir House contains the offices of the Arthur, the Trent student newspaper, and the Sadleir House Alternative Library.

Julian Blackburn College 
This college offered programs for part-time students in Peterborough until 2011. It is named after Julian Blackburn, one of the original professors who helped establish Trent. The college is now defunct, but the Julian Blackburn Hall is now home to Trent's administration, as well as medical, counselling, printing, parking, registrar, financial aid, student affairs, student accounts, and several other important university services.

Trent University Durham GTA 
Trent's Durham GTA campus in the Regional Municipality of Durham has been offering courses for over 40 years, initially in classrooms rented from Eastwood Collegiate and Vocational Institute. Later, Trent took space at Durham College and steadily expanded the range of courses available before acquiring a former elementary school on Thornton Road. Trent renovated the building, added an addition and officially opened its new Oshawa campus on Monday, 18 October 2010 and was inaugurated for the 2010–2011 academic year. Over 1 900 students attend Trent University Durham, who can study full- or part-time for degrees in anthropology, business administration, communications and critical thinking, English literature, history, media studies, psychology, social work, sociology, and the teacher education stream. In addition to the above, there are several course offerings (some with the possibility of a minor) at Trent's Durham campus that students can take and later major in at the Peterborough campus, including: biology, computer information systems, cultural studies, economics, environmental & resource studies, geography, modern languages, philosophy, political studies, and women's studies.

Graduate studies 
Trent has a number of graduate programs including Anthropology M.A. (current focus is in physical anthropology and archaeology), Applications of Modelling in the Natural & Social Sciences M.A./M.Sc., Public Texts (English) M.A., History M.A., Cultural Studies M.A. and PhD, Environmental and Life Sciences (formerly known as Watershed Ecosystems) Ph.D. / M.Sc., and Materials Sciences Ph.D./M.Sc. as well as a Psychology M.A./M.Sc. The Frost Centre for Canadian Studies and Indigenous Studies offers an interdisciplinary Canadian Studies and Indigenous Studies M.A. program. In addition, the centre offers, in collaboration with Carleton University, a Canadian Studies Ph.D. program, which was the first of its kind in Canada.

In July 2014, Trent announced they will open a Masters in Educational Studies program that will begin in July 2015.

Indigenous studies 
For more than 50 years, Trent has incorporated traditional teachings and perspectives into its programming. It was the first university in Canada, and only the second in North America, to establish an academic department dedicated to the study of Indigenous peoples and Indigenous knowledge. Trent's Chanie Wenjack School for Indigenous Studies offers undergraduate, master's and Ph,D. programs in Indigenous Studies. Trent University offers a program in Indigenous Environmental Studies in addition to a specialized Diploma in Foundations of Indigenous Learning that provides access for people of Indigenous heritage. The First Peoples House of Learning houses Nozhem, a First Peoples performance space.

Administration

Chancellors 
Leslie Frost (1967–1973)
Eugene Forsey (1973–1977)
William Morton (1977–1980)
Margaret Laurence (1981–1983)
John J. Robinette (1984–1987)
Kenneth Hare (1988–1995)
Mary Simon (1995–1999)
Peter Gzowski (1999–2002)
Roberta Bondar (2003–2009)
Tom Jackson (2009–2013)
Don Tapscott (2013–2019)
Stephen Stohn (June 2019–present)

Presidents 
Thomas H. B. Symons (1963–1972)
Thomas E. W. Nind (1972–1979)
Donald F. Theall (1980–1987)
John O. Stubbs (1987–1993)
Leonard W. Conolly (1994–1997)
David C. Smith—Interim President (1997–1998)
Bonnie M. Patterson (1998–2009)
Steven E. Franklin (2009–2014)
Leo Groarke (2014–present)

Labour unions and associations
Part-time contract faculty (Course Instructors, Clinical Instructors, Tutorial Leaders, etc.) and Student Academic Workers (Graduate Teaching Assistants, Markers) are represented by the Canadian Union of Public Employees (CUPE) Local 3908.

Support Staff (secretaries, maintenance staff, caretakers, groundskeepers, assistants, etc.) are part of the Ontario Public Service Employees Union (OPSEU) Local 365.

Professors (Full, Associate, and Assistant) both full-time tenured and part-time are represented by the Trent University Faculty Association (TUFA).

All full-time undergraduate and consecutive education students are represented through channels of the university by the Trent Central Student Association (TCSA) and the Trent Durham Student Association (TDSA), both of which operate as nonpartisan associations representing the best interest of all students. Full-time and part-time graduate students are represented by the Trent Graduate Students' Association (TGSA).

Technology
Trent University offers a number of Internet-based courses to their students. Trent's primary LMS is Blackboard. Many course lectures are also webcast for students.

Media
Arthur is a student-published newspaper at Trent. The paper is distributed on the Trent campus and around the Peterborough community free of charge; All students pay a non-refundable levy in their student fees to Arthur. Absynthe Magazine is another student paper at Trent. Founded in 1999, it is a submissions-based publication, reliant on members of the Trent community to provide content. Like Arthur, it is distributed free of charge. Absynthe receives a refundable levy from each full-time student of Trent University.

Trent Radio operates the community's student sponsored community radio (formerly classified as student radio) broadcast facility—CFFF 92.7fm. Full-time students pay a membership fee as part of their student fees to support Trent Radio activities. TrentBook is a website designed by students for students. This website has articles and discussions on an array of topics that concern Trent students. Students can also post and ask questions that they might want to have answered or discussed about.

The final scenes of Urban Legends: Final Cut (2000) were filmed at Trent University.

Clubs and groups

Trent has a variety of clubs and groups, including a number of theatre groups, social interest groups, newspapers, religious groups, political chapters and academic societies and Greeks. These groups include The Trent Business Students' Association, the Trent History Undergraduate Society (THUGS), the Peterborough chapter of the Ontario Public Interest Research Group, Anne Shirley Theatre Company, Trent Outdoors, Sustainable Trent, the Centre for Gender and Social Justice (previously known as Trent Women's Centre), The Trent University Lions Club, Trent Cricket Association, Rotaract Peterborough and Canadian Union of Public Employees Local 3908. These groups are showcased during Orientation Week (Oweek) for the benefit of new students. The university is also served by the Trent University Emergency First Response Team (TUEFRT), a student run organization whose members provide emergency first aid to all students, visitors and staff on campus.

Though Trent University does not recognize fraternities and sororities on their campus, there are a few that operation off campus. There is one fraternity; Tau Kappa Epsilon and four sororities; Alpha Pi Phi, Delta Phi Nu, Kappa Sigma Psi and Sigma Psi Alpha.

Athletics 

There are many varsity and intramural sports at Trent. The university competes at the varsity level under the name Excalibur in men's and women's curling, cross country, rugby union, volleyball, fencing, rowing, competitive swimming, and soccer. Trent University installed a new artificial turf athletics field in the summer of 2005. The field was built as part of Trent's bid to hold the 2007 U19 Women's Lacrosse Championships. There is seating for 1,000 spectators. Each autumn, Trent in conjunction with the Peterborough Rowing Club hosts the Head of the Trent rowing regatta, a  head-style race along the Trent Canal and Otonabee River, finishing under the Faryon Bridge on the Trent University campus. The day-long event is open to university, club, and high school crews. The Head of the Trent weekend, which also serves as a homecoming event, takes place at Trent University and includes a wide range of athletic and festive events. The Head of The Trent is one of the largest events of its kind in the world, and the largest single-day regatta in North America. A new rowing/paddling tank, named in honour of former head coach Carol Love, was recently opened in the new Trent Community Sports and Recreation Center (formerly the Trent Athletics Complex).

Trent's lacrosse team went through the 2008 campaign with a perfect regular season of 10-0 winning the Eastern Championship. However fell short in the Bagataway Championships to the eventual CUFLA champions the Guelph Gryphons. All-Canadians included Mack O'Brien, Josh Wasson and Kalvin Thomas. Thomas was named the league's Most Out Standing Goalie with Wasson earning an honorable mention for league MVP. Jesse Thomas and his coaching staff were selected as Coaching Staff of the Year in 2008 by their peers for leading Trent to a perfect 10–0 in the regular season and reaching the Baggataway National Championship Semi Finals in only their second season of play.

The 2009 CUFLA season saw Trent's lacrosse team reach its 2nd consecutive Baggataway Final Four Championship. Veteran leadership from Senior players such as Josh Wasson Mack O'Brien Seamus McGee and Brock Boynton as well as Juniors Brock Koczka Sean McGee and Kalvin Thomas earned the Trent Excalibur team to an 8–2 season finishing first in the Eastern Conference.

In 2002–2003, the women's volleyball team obtained varsity status. Competing in the OCAA (Ontario Colleges Athletics Association), Trent, over the last 10 years has grown into a top team in the east division. Under the guidance of Coach Peter Carter (the programs only head coach), Trent has seen growth in recruiting and success. In 2009–2010, the Trent Women qualified for its first ever provincial championship (at Cambrian College). The 2010–2011 season saw Trent post a program best 18-2 regular season record, and another appearance at the provincial championships (at Loyalist College). After once again qualifying for the 2011–2012 provincial championships, Trent won the bid to host the 2012–2013 provincial championships, earning an automatic berth.

The Trent Women's volleyball team has had one athlete (Becki Rodin) inducted into the OCAA Hall of Fame.

The Trent University Taekwondo team—under the influence of Tom Locke and Doug Johnson won the Canadian University Taekwondo championships for two years in a row. A change in the rules of the competition prevented Trent from winning a third consecutive title opting instead for a second place.

Academic reputation

In Maclean's 2023 university rankings, Trent University ranked fourth in its "primarily undergraduate" category.

Trent University is ranked 29th among Canada's top universities and 884th among the world's universities, according to the Center for World University Rankings (CWUR) 2016 list of the world's top 1,000 universities, up from number 31 nationally, and number 910 overall worldwide in 2015. This places Trent University in the top 3.6% of universities worldwide. Trent University was one of 32 universities to make the list in Canada.

Notable alumni

See also 
List of Ontario Universities
Ontario Student Assistance Program
Higher education in Ontario
Canadian Interuniversity Sport
Canadian government scientific research organizations
Canadian university scientific research organizations
Canadian industrial research and development organizations

References

Published histories 
 Cole, A.O.C. "Trent: The Making of a University, 1957–1987." Peterborough: Trent University, 1992.
 Hansen, Bertrand L., Brenda McKelvie, and Donald F. Theall. "Ontario's Trent University: Rational and Different—An Illustrative Case of Selective Government Intervention." In Readings in Canadian Higher Education, edited by Cecily Watson. Toronto: OISE Press, 1988.

External links 

 
1964 establishments in Ontario
Educational institutions established in 1964
Modernist architecture in Canada